Martin Linn Clardy (April 26, 1844 – July 5, 1914) was a nineteenth-century politician, lawyer and railroad executive from Missouri. Between 1879 and 1889, he served five consecutive terms in the  U.S. House of Representatives.

Biography
Born near Farmington, Missouri, Clardy attended Saint Louis University and the University of Mississippi and graduated from the University of Virginia. During the Civil War, he served in the Confederate Army until the close of the war where he rose to the rank of major. Afterwards, he studied law and was admitted to the bar, commencing practice in Farmington, Missouri.

Congress 
Clardy was elected a Democrat to the United States House of Representatives in 1878, serving from 1879 to 1889, being unsuccessful for reelection in 1888. There, he served as chairman of the Committee on Mines and Mining from 1885 to 1887 and of the Committee on Commerce from 1887 to 1889 and was a delegate to the Democratic National Convention in 1884.

Later career 
Afterward, Clardy resumed practicing law in Farmington, Missouri, moved to St. Louis, Missouri in 1894 and was appointed general attorney of the Missouri Pacific Railway and the St. Louis, Iron Mountain and Southern Railway the same year. He was elected vice president and general solicitor of the companies in 1909 which he served as until his death.

Death and burial 
Clarify died St. Louis on July 5, 1914. Clardy was interred in Bellefontaine Cemetery in St. Louis. He is also potentially related to Robert Walter Morgan Clardy.

External links
 Retrieved on 2008-02-13

References

1844 births
1914 deaths
Missouri lawyers
19th-century American railroad executives
20th-century American railroad executives
Confederate States Army officers
Saint Louis University alumni
University of Mississippi alumni
University of Virginia alumni
Politicians from St. Louis
People of Missouri in the American Civil War
Burials at Bellefontaine Cemetery
Democratic Party members of the United States House of Representatives from Missouri
19th-century American politicians
19th-century American lawyers